Esther Quintana Salinas (born 1 July 1951) is a Mexican politician affiliated with the PAN. She served as Deputy of the LXII Legislature of the Mexican Congress representing Coahuila, and previously served in the LVIII Legislature of the Congress of Coahuila.

References

1951 births
Living people
Politicians from Guerrero
People from Acapulco
Women members of the Chamber of Deputies (Mexico)
National Action Party (Mexico) politicians
21st-century Mexican politicians
21st-century Mexican women politicians
National Autonomous University of Mexico alumni
Members of the Congress of Coahuila
Deputies of the LXII Legislature of Mexico
Members of the Chamber of Deputies (Mexico) for Coahuila